Gamini Chandrakirthi Hettiarachchi (24 July 1950 – 27 May 2019) was an actor in Sri Lankan cinema, stage drama and television.

Personal life
Hettiarachchi was born on 24 July 1950 as the sixth of the family with ten siblings for Stanley Alas Hettiarachchi and Soma Hettiarachchi. He has three elder brothers, two elder sisters, two younger sisters and two younger brothers. He was educated at Nalanda College, Colombo and completed his GCE A/L education through science stream. He was a retired Technical officer in Department of Railways.

He was married to Subhashini in 1983 and had one daughter and one son. He met Subhashini during Shilpa Shalikawa program held in Lionel Wendt. His daughter Pratibha is a renowned award-winning actress. His son Shakthi is a video editor.

He died on 27 May 2019 while receiving treatment, after a kidney transplant surgery.

Beyond acting
In the school, he was a member of Under-14 cricket team and karate team. During Advanced Levels in the school, he started to read Russian books particularly on politics. Then he obtained the membership of Communist Party.

Acting career
Whilst at College, he performed in Ediriweera Sarachchandra's stage drama, Raththaran. Also whilst a pupil at Nalanda, he acted in Dhamma Jagoda's play Vesmuhunu. In 1974, he engaged in street dramas under the guidance of Gamini Haththotuwegama and performed in Minihekuta Ellila Marenna Barida? and Bosath Dakma. His first main role in stage dramas came through 1976 drama Sekkuwa. He won a merit award for the role at National Drama Festival. Some of his other popular stage dramas include Wedikkarayo, Suba Sandewak, Mee Pura Wasiyo, Uththamawi, Esala Sanda Awanhala, Hora Police, Charitha Hathak and Dummala Warama.

His first teledrama acting came through Yashorawaya with the character Sunimal. Then he appeared in many television serials such as Sihina Puraya, Pahasara and Sidu. In 1991, he won the award for the Best Actor for his role in the Dadabima teledrama.

Selected television serials

 Abuddassa Kalaya
 Ada Ada Ei Maru
 Anavaratha
 Aththamma
 Bhavana – Amuttha
 Bhavathra
 Bonikko
Dadu Kete
 Dangakara Tharu
 Deva Daruwo
 Gini Pupuru
 Girikula
 Ingammaruwa
 Kinduru Adaviya
 Makara Dadayama
Malee
Medagedara
Millewa Walawwa
 Nil Mal Viyana
Oru Bendi Siyambalawa
Pahasara
 Raja Bhavana
 Senehasa Kaviyak
 Senehasata Adarei
Sidu
Sihina Puraya
 Sihina Sithuvam
 Sulang Kapolla
 Swarna Veena
 Vinivindimi
Yashorawaya
 Yes Boss

Filmography
He started cinema career with the short film Palamuwaniya Saha Anthimaya in 1980 and then through Hemasiri Sellapperuma's 1992 film Bajar Eke Chandiya. His most popular cinema acting came through the films Kosthapal Punyasoma in 2014, Vidhu and Sinhawalokanaya.

 No. denotes the Number of Sri Lankan film in the Sri Lankan cinema.

References

External links
 
 
දිවි රඟමඩලට සමුදුන් රංගධරයා

1950 births
2019 deaths
Sri Lankan male film actors
Sinhalese male actors
Sri Lankan male television actors
Alumni of Nalanda College, Colombo
20th-century Sri Lankan male actors
21st-century Sri Lankan male actors
Sri Lankan male stage actors